Stary Akbulyak (İśke Aqbüläk) is a rural locality (a village) and the administrative centre of Staroakbulyakovsky Selsoviet, Karaidelsky District, Bashkortostan, Russia. The population was 502 as of 2010. There are 4 streets.

Geography 
Stary Akbulyak is located 17 km northwest of Karaidel (the district's administrative centre) by road. Novy Akbulyak is the nearest rural locality.

References 

Rural localities in Karaidelsky District